Capital punishment was abolished in the U.S. state of North Dakota in 1973. Historically, a total of eight people have been executed in North Dakota, including one execution prior to North Dakota attaining statehood.

History

According to the North Dakota Penal Code, the imposing of sentences was handed to a jury, with the suggested punishment for first-degree murder being death by hanging or life imprisonment. Until 1903 executions were carried out in public. The first private execution was that of John Rooney, who was hanged inside the Cass County prison on October 17, 1905. Rooney was the last person executed in North Dakota. In 1915, the death penalty was abolished for ordinary murder, commuting the death sentence of Joe Milo, who was convicted of double murder in course of a robbery. It remained for treason and murder committed by an inmate already serving a life sentence, however, nobody was executed for these offenses until the death penalty was finally abolished in 1973.

No federal executions have ever taken place in North Dakota. On February 8, 2007, Alfonso Rodriguez, Jr. was sentenced to death for the kidnapping and murder of Dru Sjodin and is now the only person on federal death row for a crime committed in North Dakota. Because Rodriguez took Sjodin's corpse across state lines, he was eligible for federal prosecution, and therefore for the death penalty. U.S. District Judge Ralph R. Erickson arranged that Rodriguez would be executed according to South Dakota rules. Rodriguez was the first person in North Dakota to receive a death sentence in over a century.

See also
 List of people executed in North Dakota
 Crime in North Dakota
 Law of North Dakota

References

External links
Frank Vyzralek, Capital crimes and criminals executed in northern Dakota Territory and North Dakota, 1885–1905", 2000-10-19

 
North Dakota
North Dakota law